The Jodrell Professor of Zoology and Comparative Anatomy is a chair at University College London, endowed (shortly after the Jodrell Chair of Physiology) by TJ Phillips Jodrell in 1874. 

UCL was the first university in England to have a Chair of Zoology, and the first holder was Robert Edmond Grant after which the post received the Jodrell endowment.
Until 1948, the professor of Zoology was also Curator of the Grant Museum of Zoology, after this point the two roles were separated.

Jodrell was a 'wealthy eccentric' who went insane before his gift could be completed, requiring the 'Masters in Lunacy' to confirm the donation.

Professor of Zoology and Comparative Anatomy 
1827-1874 Robert Edmond Grant

Jodrell Professors of Zoology and Comparative Anatomy 
1874-1889 Sir Ray Lankester 
1889-1899 Raphael Weldon
1899-1906 Edward Alfred Minchin
1906-21 James Peter Hill 
1921-51 D. M. S. Watson
1951-62 Sir Peter Medawar
1962-70 Michael Abercrombie
1970-91 Avrion Mitchison
2019-present Max J Telford

References 

Academics of University College London
Professorships at University College London